In mathematics, the Laguerre polynomials, named after Edmond Laguerre (1834–1886), are solutions of Laguerre's differential equation:

which is a second-order linear differential equation. This equation has nonsingular solutions only if  is a non-negative integer.

Sometimes the name Laguerre polynomials is used for solutions of

where  is still a non-negative integer.
Then they are also named generalized Laguerre polynomials, as will be done here (alternatively associated Laguerre polynomials or, rarely, Sonine polynomials, after  their inventor Nikolay Yakovlevich Sonin).

More generally, a Laguerre function is a solution when  is not necessarily a non-negative integer.

The Laguerre polynomials are also used for Gaussian quadrature to numerically compute integrals of the form

These polynomials, usually denoted , , …, are a polynomial sequence which may be defined by the Rodrigues formula,

reducing to the closed form of a following section.

They are orthogonal polynomials with respect to an inner product

The sequence of Laguerre polynomials  is a Sheffer sequence,

The rook polynomials in combinatorics are more or less the same as Laguerre polynomials, up to elementary changes of variables. Further see the Tricomi–Carlitz polynomials.

The Laguerre polynomials arise in quantum mechanics, in the radial part of the solution of the Schrödinger equation for a one-electron atom. They also describe the static Wigner functions of oscillator systems in quantum mechanics in phase space. They further enter in the quantum mechanics of the Morse potential and of the 3D isotropic harmonic oscillator.

Physicists sometimes use a definition for the Laguerre polynomials that is larger by a factor of n! than the definition used here. (Likewise, some physicists may use somewhat different definitions of the so-called associated Laguerre polynomials.)

The first few polynomials 
These are the first few Laguerre polynomials:

Recursive definition, closed form, and generating function 
One can also define the Laguerre polynomials recursively, defining the first two polynomials as

and then using the following recurrence relation for any :

Furthermore,

In solution of some boundary value problems, the characteristic values can be useful:

The closed form is

The generating function for them likewise follows, 

Polynomials of negative index can be expressed using the ones with positive index:

Relation to binary functions 
There is a method to set Laguerre polynomials using functions which is related to binary expansion of :

Here

Also

Generalized Laguerre polynomials 
For arbitrary real α the polynomial solutions of the differential equation

are called generalized Laguerre polynomials, or associated Laguerre polynomials.

One can also define the generalized Laguerre polynomials recursively, defining the first two polynomials as

and then using the following recurrence relation for any :

The simple Laguerre polynomials are the special case  of the generalized Laguerre polynomials:

The Rodrigues formula for them is

The generating function for them is

Explicit examples and properties of the generalized Laguerre polynomials 
 Laguerre functions are defined by confluent hypergeometric functions and Kummer's transformation as  where  is a generalized binomial coefficient. When  is an integer the function reduces to a polynomial of degree . It has the alternative expression  in terms of Kummer's function of the second kind.
 The closed form for these generalized Laguerre polynomials of degree  is  derived by applying Leibniz's theorem for differentiation of a product to Rodrigues' formula.
 Laguerre polynomials have a differential operator representation, much like the closely related Hermite polynomials. Namely, let   and consider the differential operator . Then .
 The first few generalized Laguerre polynomials are: 
 The constant term, which is the value at 0, is 

 If  is non-negative, then Ln(α) has n real, strictly positive roots (notice that  is a Sturm chain), which are all in the interval 

As a contour integral 
Given the generating function specified above, the polynomials may be expressed in terms of a contour integral

where the contour circles the origin once in a counterclockwise direction without enclosing the essential singularity at 1

Recurrence relations 
The addition formula for Laguerre polynomials:

Laguerre's polynomials satisfy the recurrence relations

in particular

and

or

moreover

They can be used to derive the four 3-point-rules

combined they give this additional, useful recurrence relations

there is the partial fraction decomposition

For the third equality apply the fourth and fifth identities of this section.

Derivatives of generalized Laguerre polynomials 
Differentiating the power series representation of a generalized Laguerre polynomial  times leads to

This points to a special case of the formula above: for integer  the generalized polynomial may be written

the shift by  sometimes causing confusion with the usual parenthesis notation for a derivative.

Moreover, the following equation holds:

which generalizes with Cauchy's formula to

The derivative with respect to the second variable  has the  form, 

This is evident from the contour integral representation below.

The generalized Laguerre polynomials obey the differential equation

which may be compared with the equation obeyed by the kth derivative of the ordinary Laguerre polynomial,

where  for this equation only.

In Sturm–Liouville form the differential equation is

which shows that  is an eigenvector for the eigenvalue .

Orthogonality 

which follows from

If  denotes the gamma distribution then the orthogonality relation can be written as

The associated, symmetric kernel polynomial has the representations (Christoffel–Darboux formula)

recursively

Moreover,

Turán's inequalities can be derived here, which is

The following integral is needed in the quantum mechanical treatment of the hydrogen atom,

Series expansions 
Let a function have the (formal) series expansion

Then

The series converges in the associated Hilbert space  if and only if

Further examples of expansions
Monomials are represented as

while binomials have the parametrization

This leads directly to

for the exponential function. The incomplete gamma function has the representation

In quantum mechanics
In quantum mechanics the Schrödinger equation for the hydrogen-like atom is exactly solvable by separation of variables in spherical coordinates. The radial part of the wave function is a (generalized) Laguerre polynomial.

Vibronic transitions in the Franck-Condon approximation can also be described using Laguerre polynomials.

Multiplication theorems
Erdélyi gives the following two multiplication theorems

Relation to Hermite polynomials 
The generalized Laguerre polynomials are related to the Hermite polynomials:

Because of this, the generalized Laguerre polynomials arise in the treatment of the quantum harmonic oscillator.

Relation to hypergeometric functions 
The Laguerre polynomials may be defined in terms of hypergeometric functions, specifically the confluent hypergeometric functions, as

where  is the Pochhammer symbol (which in this case represents the rising factorial).

Hardy–Hille formula 
The generalized Laguerre polynomials satisfy the Hardy–Hille formula

Using the identity

(see generalized hypergeometric function), this can also be written as

This formula is a generalization of the Mehler kernel for Hermite polynomials, which can be recovered from it by using the relations between Laguerre and Hermite polynomials given above.

Physicist Scaling Convention 

The generalized Laguerre polynomials are used to describe the quantum wavefunction for hydrogen atom orbitals. In the introductory literature on this topic, a different scaling is used for the generalized Laguerre polynomials than the scaling presented in this article. In the convention taken here, the generalized Laguerre polynomials can be expressed as 

where  is the confluent hypergeometric function.

The physicist version is related to the standard version by

There is yet another convention in use, though less frequently, in the physics literature. Under this convention the Laguerre polynomials are given by

See also 
 Orthogonal polynomials
 Rodrigues' formula
 Angelescu polynomials
 Bessel polynomials
 Denisyuk polynomials
 Transverse mode, an important application of Laguerre polynomials to describe the field intensity within a waveguide or laser beam profile.

Notes

References 
 
 G. Szegő, Orthogonal polynomials, 4th edition, Amer. Math. Soc. Colloq. Publ., vol. 23, Amer. Math. Soc., Providence, RI, 1975.
 
 B. Spain, M.G. Smith, Functions of mathematical physics, Van Nostrand Reinhold Company, London, 1970. Chapter 10 deals with Laguerre polynomials.
 
 Eric W. Weisstein, "Laguerre Polynomial", From MathWorld—A Wolfram Web Resource.

External links 
 
 

Polynomials
Orthogonal polynomials
Special hypergeometric functions